The 1973 Tulane Green Wave football team was an American football team that represented Tulane University during the 1973 NCAA Division I football season as an independent. In their third year under head coach Bennie Ellender, the team compiled a 9–3 record and lost to Houston in the Astro-Bluebonnet Bowl. The Green Wave's 14–0 victory over LSU was its first over the Bayou Bengals since 1948, and first in New Orleans over LSU since 1943.

Schedule

References

Tulane
Tulane Green Wave football seasons
Tulane Green Wave football